Epidendrum alpicolum, often called Epidendrum alpicola, is a tropical orchid native to Bolivia, Colombia, Ecuador, Peru, and Venezuela at altitudes from 1.8—2.7 km

Description 
Epidendrum alpicolum is a sympodial epiphyte with slender, flattened stems, to 0.6 m tall.  The stems are covered by tubular sheathes, which bear leaves on the upper part of the stem.  The distichous linear-lanceolate leaves are often bilobulate at the apex.  The cylindrical, racemose, many-flowered inflorescence erupts from a solitary spathe (sometimes twin spathes) at the apex of the stem, as is typical of the subgenus E. subg. Spathium  The lanceolate-acuminate sepals are wedge shaped at the base: the dorsal 7–12 mm long by as little as 2 mm wide; the lateral sepals slightly larger and asymmetrical at the base.  The linear petals are much shorter than the petals.  The trilobate lip is adnate to the column to its apex:  cordate at the base, with minute crenelations on the lateral lobes, two callosities at the base, and three or more shallow keels running down the midlobe from near the column apex.

Name quibbles 
Reichenbach and Warszewicz (Rchb.f. & Warsz.) first published this species under the name Epidendrum alpicolum in 1854.  Kew Botanical Garden's World Checklist of Selected Plant Families (Kew) has no record of this name, but cites the publication by Rchb.f. & Warsz. of Epidendrum alpicolum under the name Epidendrum alpicola; Kew does not list any homonyms, synonyms, or other authority to change the name.

References

External links 

alpicolum
Orchids of Bolivia
Orchids of Colombia
Orchids of Ecuador
Orchids of Peru
Orchids of Venezuela
Plants described in 1854